The 2007 Iowa Corn Indy 250 was a race in the 2007 IRL IndyCar Series. It was held over the weekend of June 22–24, 2007, as the eighth round of the seventeen-race calendar. It was the inaugural race at the brand-new  Iowa Speedway.

Pre-Race
Practice scheduled for Friday was shortened due to thunderstorms in the area. Drivers originally believed that it would be a competitive race, but soon found out that passing would be very difficult. The other main concern of the track was the physical requirements, with the 7/8th mile track driving like a superspeedway and drivers experiencing 4.8 lateral G-Forces during the race. Scott Dixon won the pole in qualifying on Saturday (182.360 mph/17.6486 secs). Hélio Castroneves qualified 2nd (182.272 mph/17.6571 secs), while Danica Patrick came in 11th (180.974 mph/17.7838 secs).

Race
The first half of the race was a "crashfest" with 7 cars crashing out in the first 100 laps. The largest crash occurred on a restart on lap 100, when cars tried to go 4 wide on the frontstretch. Danica Patrick, Sam Hornish Jr., and others were eliminated.  Many driver's blamed the hard tires of the race. This was caused because of an unusually cool day, with temperatures around 75 degrees for the race, originally forecast as late as the night before the race around 90-95 degrees.  Pole sitter Scott Dixon had steering problems at the start, and originally retired, though his team repaired the car and he ended up 10th, many laps down. The race ended up a battle between Andretti-Green Racing teammates Dario Franchitti and Marco Andretti, with Franchitti winning. Scott Sharp came in third.

Classification

Note
Milka Duno was ordered by race officials to maintain a minimum speed and when she failed to meet that speed she was parked.

Caution Periods
There were six caution periods during the race, with a total of sixty-seven laps run under yellow.

References
IndyCar Series

Iowa Corn Indy 250
 
Iowa Corn
Iowa Corn Indy 250